Paraepepeotes togatus is a species of beetle in the family Cerambycidae. It was described by Perroud in 1855, originally under the genus Monohammus. It is known from Papua New Guinea, Australia, and Moluccas.

Subspecies
 Paraepepeotes togatus dilaceratus Breuning, 1943
 Paraepepeotes togatus rossellii Breuning, 1970
 Paraepepeotes togatus togatus (Perroud, 1855)

References

Lamiini
Beetles described in 1855